Yeallow is a French indie rock band from Strasbourg, Alsace, formed in 2008.

Biography 

The idea for the project was born in Strasbourg. A debut home mixed EP – One – digitally released in 2009 quickly found its audience cosmopolitan and trans-generational. On top of this, they managed to get some international sales is even some promising reviews. In 2009, a viral film for SFR uses the title “Temptation” as the soundtrack for the launch of its new product.

In 2010, the group, composed of five musicians with Pascal (vocals, guitar, keyboard) went back to the studio for their second album.
By mixing in analogy at the studio Grenat in Strasbourg and the mastering being taken care of by Jay Franco from Sterling Sound New York (Art Brut, Coldplay,...), Yeallow demonstrated again their ambition to be at the heart of an international scene alternative rock, energetic and neat. “2891 seconds” as the duration of the album, offers the fusion of the world of the five members. It is an elegant mix of analogue and electronic sounds that may suggest roots in the side of Bowie, Lou Reed or Radiohead.

In early 2010, everything accelerated. FNAC partnership initiated by the head of FNAC Strasbourg allowed the group to present their album on a Showcase in all of the Fnac in the country and a physical distribution deal was quickly signed with a national player. Sent to many media, the album got rave reviews from thirty print and web and radio broadcasts in France, Belgium, England, Russia, USA and Japan.

After many concerts in Alsace and especially at the Festival of Artefacts 2010 in front of a large audience, Yeallow played at the Bus Palladium in July 2010. A few venues later and in parallel with a new album in the making, it is at the end of 2010 that Yeallow is approached by a tour and events organizer in California based in Los Angeles. It offered them a dozen dates in the venues and clubs of the city as the Cat Club, the Mess bar, the Whisky a Go Go in Los Angeles and in San Francisco at the Kimos. In all, seven dates in California from March 25 to April 8, 2011.

From acoustic concerts (Goom Radio – Live SFR- to more muscular shows, Yeallow takes another dimension in Live. To manage the development of the group and to take the next steps, professional support was needed. Since early 2011, Yeallow entrusted its management to his English manager Amina Martin – Rubis Management LTD – and his booking to David Killhoffer booking agent – Music For Ever (Scorpions, Popa Chubby, Pat MacManus, ...). In July 2011, Pascal left the band.

The four remaining members continue to expand on the international indie rock scene.

Members 

 Peter Maubeuge: Vocals, guitars, Keyboard
 Ted: Guitars, backing vocals
 Bill: Bass, keyboards
 Ced: Drums, Percussion

Discography 

 One - 2009 (Try&Dye Records/tunecore)
 2891 seconds - CD - 2010 (Try&Dye Records /ILD / Believe)
 The Bright Side - Single - 2010 (Try&Dye Records)
 The Void / Blown Away - Single - 2012 (Try&Dye Records)
 Clocks - single - 2014 (Try&Dye Records)
 Homebred - CD - 2015 (Try&Dye Records / Believe)

Label: Try & Dye Records
Mastering: Sterling Sound / Jay Franco (Art brut, Coldplay, The beastie Boys, ...

Selection of other venues played  
London
 The Clapham Grand
 The Camden Rock
 The Halfmoon
 O2 Academy Islington
 The Dublin Castle (04.13.14)

Oxford
 O2 Academy Oxford (04.15.14)

Liverpool
 The Cavern Club (2011 & 2012)

Los Angeles
 The Whisky a Go Go
 The Cat Club
 The Airliner
 The Mezz Bar
 O’Brien's

San Francisco
 The Kimo's

Germany
 Sun Beatz Club
 The Beach Bar

Paris
 THE BUS PALLADIUM
 GOOM RADIO / Showcase

Strasbourg
 La Laiterie / Festival des Artefacts (2010 & 2012)
 Museum of Modern Art
 La Salamandre
 Hall Des Chars
 Le Star
 L’aubette Galerie Concept
 NRJ Stage / Fête de la Musique
 FNAC / Showcase

Mulhouse
 Le Noumatrouff
 FNAC / Showcase

References

External links 
 YEALLOW official Web page
 YEALLOW official Facebook page
 YEALLOW official Youtube channel

French alternative rock groups
Organizations based in Strasbourg
Musical groups from Grand Est